13058 Alfredstevens, provisional designation , is a stony Vestian asteroid from the inner regions of the asteroid belt, approximately 3 kilometers in diameter. It was discovered by Belgian astronomer Eric Elst at ESO's La Silla Observatory in Northern Chile, on 19 November 1990. The asteroid was named for Belgian painter Alfred Stevens.

Orbit and classification 

Based on its orbital elements, Alfredstevens is a member of the Vesta family, a group of asteroids that originated from a massive impact on the Southern Hemnisphere of 4 Vesta, the family's namesake. It orbits the Sun in the inner main-belt at a distance of 2.1–2.6 AU once every 3 years and 7 months (1,324 days). Its orbit has an eccentricity of 0.12 and an inclination of 6° with respect to the ecliptic.

The body's observation arc begins just five days prior to its official discovery observation, with a precovery taken at Palomar Observatory on 14 November 1990.

Physical characteristics

Lightcurves 

In January 2013, a rotational lightcurve of Alfredstevens was obtained from photometric observations in the R-band by astronomers at the Palomar Transient Factory in California. Lightcurve analysis gave a rotation period of  hours with a brightness variation of 0.45 magnitude.

Diameter and albedo 

According to the survey carried out by the NEOWISE mission of NASA's space-based Wide-field Infrared Survey Explorer, Alfredstevens measures 2.6 kilometers in diameter and its surface has a high albedo of 0.34, while the Collaborative Asteroid Lightcurve Link assumes a standard albedo for stony asteroids of 0.20 and calculates a larger diameter of 3.1 kilometers with an absolute magnitude of 14.93.

Naming 

This minor planet was named in honor of Belgian painter Alfred Stevens (1823–1906), known for his paintings of elegant modern women. The official naming citation was published by the Minor Planet Center on 30 January 2010.

References

External links 
 Asteroid Lightcurve Database (LCDB), query form (info )
 Dictionary of Minor Planet Names, Google books
 Asteroids and comets rotation curves, CdR – Observatoire de Genève, Raoul Behrend
 Discovery Circumstances: Numbered Minor Planets (1)-(5000) – Minor Planet Center
 
 

013058
Discoveries by Eric Walter Elst
Named minor planets
19901119